O'Donovan Rossa or Skibbereen is a Gaelic football and hurling club based in Skibbereen, County Cork, Ireland. It participates in Cork GAA competitions. Traditionally, the club has been much more successful in Gaelic football. It won its only Cork Senior Football Championship in 1992 and subsequently won the All-Ireland Senior Club Football Championship after beating Éire Óg of Carlow in the final. The club participates in the Carbery division of Cork GAA.

Honours
 All-Ireland Senior Club Football Championship: Winners (1) 1992-93
 Cork Senior Football Championship: Winners (1) 1992 Runners-Up 1994
 Cork Intermediate Football Championship: Winners (2) 1924, 1985 Runners-Up 1914, 1983, 1984
 Cork Junior B Hurling Championship: Winners (2) 2004, 2013
 Cork Minor Football Championship: Winners (1) 2001 Runners-Up 1981, 1983, 1987
 Cork Minor A Football Championship: Winners (1) 2008
 West Cork Junior A Football Championship: Winners (6) 1945, 1961, 1963, 1974, 1979, 1982 Runners -Up: 1932, 1933, 1951, 1952, 1954, 1957, 1976, 2005
 West Cork Junior A Hurling Championship: Winners (3) 1931, 1932, 1933 Runners-Up 1928, 1943, 1944, 1945, 1946, 1948, 1956, 2008
 West Cork Junior B Hurling Championship: Winners (6) 1955, 1960, 1983, 1995, 2004, 2013  Runners-Up: 1971, 1972, 1973, 1981, 1993, 1997, 2000, 2003
 West Cork Junior B Football Championship: Winners (2) 1955, 1963 Runners-Up: 1943, 1956
 West Cork Junior C Football Championship: Winners (1) 1980 Runners-Up: 1979, 1980, 2001
 West Cork Minor A Football Championship: Winners (13) 1943, 1949, 1950, 1958, 1963, 1981, 1982, 1983, 1985, 1986, 1987, 1988, 2008 Runners-Up: 1965, 1966, 1976, 1980, 1984, 1991
 West Cork Minor B Hurling Championship: Winners (1) 1983

Notable players
 Tony Davis
 Don Davis
 John Evans
 Conor McCarthy
 Michael McCarthy
 Kevin O'Dwyer

References

Gaelic football clubs in County Cork
Hurling clubs in County Cork
Gaelic games clubs in County Cork
Skibbereen